Phainodina is a genus of leaf beetles in the subfamily Eumolpinae. It is distributed in New Guinea, and its name refers to the beetles being shiny and Nodina-shaped.

Species
 Phainodina alphiniae Gressitt, 1969
 Phainodina alticola Gressitt, 1969
 Phainodina antennalis Medvedev, 2009
 Phainodina brandtella Gressitt, 1969
 Phainodina femorata Medvedev, 2009
 Phainodina guineensis (Bryant, 1950)
 Phainodina ornata Gressitt, 1969
 Phainodina picta (Baly, 1867)
 Phainodina riedeli Medvedev, 2009
 Phainodina strigicollis Medvedev, 2017
 Phainodina stygica Gressitt, 1969
 Phainodina subcorrugata Gressitt, 1969
 Phainodina thoracica Medvedev, 2017

References

Eumolpinae
Chrysomelidae genera
Beetles of Oceania
Insects of New Guinea
Endemic fauna of New Guinea